Immanuvel Devendrar (9 October 1924 – 11 September 1957), who later took the name Immanuel Sekaran, was a freedom fighter, civil rights activist, former soldier and a party worker for the Indian National Congress in Tamil Nadu, India, who was murdered by a group of people from another caste.

Early life 
Immanuvel Devendrar was born in Sellur, Mudukulathur, Tamil Nadu on 9 October 1924 to Vedhanayagam,  a school teacher and founder of Devendra Kula Vellalar Sangam.

Politics 
He took part in the Quit India movement from the age of 18 and was imprisoned for three months because of it. In 1945, he enlisted in the British Indian Army and, upon his discharge, he returned to his native Ramanathapuram district to work for the Indian National Congress party (INC). His time in the army had caused him to question the historic oppression of the Pallar caste in his district, which was particularly severe.

Devendrar worked to improve the education, rights and representation of the Pallars, of which he was a member. He tried to mobilise them to demand equality. The INC saw him as a useful opposition to Pasumpon Mutharamalingam Thevar, who had defected from the party to join the Forward Bloc. The party thought that he might be a worthy future member of the Legislative Assembly and groomed him for that end. It was for this reason that he converted to the Hindu religion and took the name Immanuel Sekaran.

Assassination

Background 
The Pallars were often in dispute with the Thevar caste and the relationship between the communities became fraught following a by-election in 1957. A peace meeting was called with the district collector in presence. When Muthuramalinga Thevar entered this meeting, everybody stood up with the exception of Immanuel Sekaran. Sekaran was asked why he did not stand up when a leader entered. Sekaran replied, 'He is not a leader to me. He wanted to destroy my whole community.' This hurt Thevar's ego very much and as a consequence, the talks came to an abrupt end without any solution in sight.

Incident 
Devandrar was ambushed and murdered by a group of Thevars for his activity on 11 September 1957.

Aftermath 
Dravidian parties accused that Thevar himself had some responsibility for the death. Thevar was in fact arrested but later released without charge.

The 1957 Ramnad riots, in which 42 Dalits were killed, occurred as a consequence of Devendrar's murder, but approx. 20 supporters of U. Muthuramalingam Thevar and 30 Pallar, Schedule Caste people died according to 1957 Ramnad riots data, not counting the injured personnel.

Legacy 
The anniversary of Devendrar's death is celebrated annually as Devendrar Jayanti by Devendra Kula community people in Tamil Nadu.

See also 
 Paramakudi Riots

References 

1924 births
1957 deaths
People from Ramanathapuram district
Indian Tamil people
Activists from Tamil Nadu
Assassinated activists
Indian National Congress politicians from Tamil Nadu
Indian independence activists from Tamil Nadu
Murder in India
Caste-related violence in India